The 1986 Maryland gubernatorial election was held on November 4, 1986. Democratic nominee William Donald Schaefer defeated Republican nominee Thomas J. Mooney with 82.37% of the vote. To date this is the largest percentage total ever for a contested statewide election in Maryland.

, this was the last time a candidate from either party carried every county in a gubernatorial election, and the last time the Democratic candidate won a majority of counties in a gubernatorial election. He is also the last Democrat to win the following counties: Garrett, Washington, Carroll, Queen Anne's, Caroline, Dorchester, Wicomico, and Somerset. Frederick County would not vote Democratic again until 2022.

Primary elections
Primary elections were held on September 9, 1986.

Democratic primary

Candidates
William Donald Schaefer, Mayor of Baltimore
Stephen H. Sachs, Attorney General of Maryland
Lawrence K. Freeman
Mary Fellenbaum Holter

Results

General election

Candidates
William Donald Schaefer, Democratic
Thomas J. Mooney, Republican

Results

References

1986
Maryland
Gubernatorial